The 2012–13 Maltese Second Division (also known as 2012–13 BOV 2nd Division due to sponsorship reasons) began on 14 September 2012 and ended on 28 April 2013.

Participating teams
 Fgura United F.C.
 Gharghur United F.C.
 Kirkop United
 Mellieha S.C.
 Mgarr United F.C
 Msida SJ F.C
 Pembroke Athleta F.C.
 San Gwann F.C
 Siggiewi F.C.
 St. George's F.C.
 St. Patrick F.C.
 St. Venera Lightning F.C.
 Zebbug Rangers
 Zurrieq F.C.

Changes from previous season
 Gżira United and Gudja United were promoted to the 2012–13 Maltese First Division. They were replaced with St. Patrick and St. George's, relegated from 2011-12 Maltese First Division .
Attard F.C., Senglea Athletic F.C. and Luqa St. Andrew's F.C. were relegated to the 2012–13 Third Division. They were replaced with Pembroke Athleta F.C., Fgura United F.C. and Mgarr United F.C, all promoted from 2011–12 Maltese Third Division.

Final league table

Results

Top 10 scorers

External links
 2012-13 Second Division Results and Fixtures 
 2012-13 Second Table and Records  
  Zebbug Rangers Champions 
  Msida Saint Joseph Promoted 
 Mgarr and Santa Venera Relegated 
  Zurrieq and St Georges Promoted 

Maltese Second Division seasons
Malta
3